Frank Aloyvisous Miller  (1874–1951) was a Major League Baseball Infielder. He played in one game at shortstop for the Washington Senators in 1892, one game at third base for the St. Louis Browns in 1892 and three games at second base for the Philadelphia Phillies in 1897. His minor league playing career stretched from 1892–1900. He later managed in the minors in the Illinois–Indiana–Iowa League in 1904 and the South Atlantic League in 1910.

External links

1874 births
1951 deaths
Major League Baseball second basemen
Major League Baseball third basemen
Major League Baseball shortstops
Washington Senators (1891–1899) players
St. Louis Browns (NL) players
Philadelphia Phillies players
19th-century baseball players
Baseball players from Pennsylvania
Harrisburg Ponies players
Scranton Indians players
Reading Actives players
Pottsville Colts players
New Castle Quakers players
Montreal Royals players
Youngstown Puddlers players
Minor league baseball managers
Milwaukee Cream Citys players